Ritual is an online retailer of multivitamins and nutritional supplements headquartered in Culver City, Los Angeles. The startup was established in 2016 by Katerina Schneider.

Overview
Ritual formulates, manufactures, and distributes multivitamins, protein supplements, and probiotic products. It started when Schneider was planning to start a family and realized that her multivitamins bore potentially harmful ingredients.  She started Ritual in 2016 after spending a year researching women's diets with Dr. Luke Bucci to identify what vitamins women really needed. The sales of the company are based on online subscription. The company has been criticized for its marketing and advertisement techniques claiming misrepresentation of paid endorsements.

References

External links

Online retailers of the United States